Fay Kleinman (November 29, 1912 – February 21, 2012) was an American painter. She was also known by her married names, Fay Skurnick, and then Fay Levenson. The medium of most of the works Kleinman created is oil on canvas, but she also produced some mixed-media work and watercolors. She exhibited in museums in New York and Massachusetts and in galleries throughout the country. She was the co-founder of the Becket Arts Center in Becket, Massachusetts.

Biography
Kleinman studied at the American Artists School: murals with Anton Refregier, painting with Jean Liberte, and sculpture with Milton Hebald. She also took classes through the WPA, City College of New York, and the National Academy of Design.

Kleinman continued to paint into her nineties. She painted portraits of her daughter and both her grandsons. One portrait of her grandson, Randy Napoleon at ten years old was purchased in 2005 by the Ypsilanti District Library in Ypsilanti, Michigan, where it hangs in front of the children's collection. Another painting of Randy and paintings of Brian Napoleon were included in a 2006 show at the Ann Arbor District Library, Ordinary People, in which Kleinman showed the extraordinary qualities of "ordinary" individuals.

In addition to portraits, she created abstractions, still lifes, and landscapes. She was best known for her "Zayde" series, paintings created from sketches her father did for her daughter based on stories her daughter, then three, made up for him. They were first exhibited in 1971 at the Becket Arts Center, Massachusetts. They were compared to the works of Paul Klee, include fanciful figures and places.

After a career that included sales through galleries in New York and various New England cities, Kleinman sold many paintings in her senior years. In 2007 the University of Michigan purchased a mixed media self-portrait of a woman reading a newspaper. It is permanently displayed in the University's new East Ann Arbor Health Center.

After her death, in August 2012, some of her paintings were displayed at Gallery 55+ in Ann Arbor and she was given a retrospective by the University of Michigan School of Art & Design. More than 300 paintings were displayed in the latter, which chronicled Kleinman's career from the early 1930s through 2010, when she did her last full painting. Local news site singled out her painting, The World Around Me, as the key work, saying it was painted with "a directness that’s a testimony to the aesthetic and social integrity that modernism sought to reflect."

In 2021, her grandson Randy Napoleon released an album, Rust Belt Roots, and used a photograph of her painting, Ypsilanti Blues, as cover art. In 2022, Randy Napoleon released an album, Puppets, with her painting Masks as cover art.

Kleinman survived two husbands, Jack Skurnick, who died in 1952 and was the father of Davida, also known as Davi Napoleon. Skurnick was a record producer and violinist. She later married Emanuel Levenson, a pianist and music director of an opera company who taught music at The New School in New York City. He co-founded the Becket Arts Center with her.

She was born in the Bronx, New York, where she lived until 1958, when she moved to Brooklyn Heights, also in New York City. In 1964, she moved to Becket, MA. In 1988, she moved to Ypsilanti MI to live near her daughter.

References

External links
 Home Page
Obituary for second husband, Emanuel Levenson, in the "New York Times"
Obituary for Fay Kleinman in The Ann Arbor News
Exhibit at Slusser Gallery
Facebook page devoted to online exhibit of some of Kleinman's work
Artworks in collection of Ypsilanti District Library. Scroll down to Kleinman

1912 births
2012 deaths
American women painters
People from Ypsilanti, Michigan
Painters from New York (state)
Painters from Michigan
People from Becket, Massachusetts
21st-century American women